Norway is an unincorporated community in Republic County, Kansas, United States.  As of the 2020 census, the population of the community and nearby areas was 17.  It is located south of Scandia at Norway Lane and K-148 highway.

History
The first post office in Norway was established in 1870.

Demographics

For statistical purposes, the United States Census Bureau has defined Norway as a census-designated place (CDP).

Education
The community is served by Pike Valley USD 426 public school district.

References

Further reading

External links
 Republic County maps: Current, Historic, KDOT

Unincorporated communities in Republic County, Kansas
Unincorporated communities in Kansas